Lalun (1952 – 1977) was an American Thoroughbred racehorse and successful broodmare. Owned and bred by Harry Guggenheim, she was trained by Loyd Gentry, Jr. and under jockey Henry Moreno notably won the 1955 Kentucky Oaks and Beldame Stakes.

As a brood mare, Lalun produced:
 The 1962 U.S. Champion 2-Yr-Old Colt Male Colt Never Bend who in turn sired Mill Reef and Riverman.
 Bold Reason who won the 1971 American and Hollywood Derbys and the Travers Stakes.

References
 Lalun's pedigree and partial racing stats

1952 racehorse births
1977 racehorse deaths
Racehorses bred in Kentucky
Racehorses trained in the United States
Kentucky Oaks winners
Thoroughbred family 19-b